At least two ships of the Peruvian Navy have been named BAP Diez Canseco:

 , was an  launched in 1944 as USS Shoveler she was transferred to Peru in 1960
 , was a  launched in 1956 as HNLMS Rotterdam she was transferred to Peru in 1981 serving until being decommissioned in 1991

Peruvian Navy ship names